"Eclipse" is a song by Dutch DJ Hardwell. It is the opening song and the fourth single from his 2015 debut studio album United We Are.

Background 
The song was regularly played by Hardwell in his Ultra Music Festival sets since 2014 as the opening song.

Charts

References 

2015 songs
2015 singles
Hardwell songs
Songs written by Hardwell